This article details the 2008 Super League season results. From February to October 2008, a total of 162 games were played by twelve teams over 27 regular rounds, in addition to six games played during the play-off series. The season culminated with the Grand Final on 4 October.

Regular season 

All teams were required to play each team twice, once home and once away, as well as their Millennium Magic fixture, and four more fixtures decided by their league position at the end of the 2007 season.

Round 1

Round 2

Round 3

Round 4 
 Leeds Rhinos vs Hull Kingston Rovers played before Round 1 to avoid a clash with Leeds' 2008 World Club Challenge fixture against the Melbourne Storm on 29 February.

Round 5 
 Leeds, who had not dropped a point so far, became the first team to lose to Castleford this season.

Round 6

Round 7

Round 8

Round 9

Round 10

Round 11

Round 12

Round 13: Millennium Magic 

 Round 13 of Super League XIII saw all of its games played at the Millennium Stadium, Cardiff in the Millennium Magic event.

Round 14

Round 15

Round 16 
 Wigan Warriors vs Huddersfield Giants rearranged due a pitch relay at the JJB Stadium.

Round 17

Round 18

Round 19

Round 20

Round 21

Round 22

Round 23

Round 24

Round 25

Round 26

Round 27

Play-offs 

The 2008 Super League championship was decided through a play-off system, in which the participants were included according to their league position at the end of 27 regular rounds. The play-off system had no bearing on the minor premiership (otherwise known as the League Leaders' Shield).

Format 

Super League XIII followed the top-six play-off system. It was the seventh year in a row the format had been applied, as well as being the final year before the play-offs were expanded in the 2009 season. Places were granted to the top six teams in the Super League XIII table. Following the final round of matches on the weekend of 5–7 September, all six play-off teams were set (in order of finishing place):

Home field advantage was given by league position at the end of regular rounds, with the lower of the two teams playing at the higher team's ground. The only exception to this was the Grand Final, which was played at Old Trafford following tradition. The top-six system followed double elimination rules for the first and second placed team, meaning whichever of the teams lost in the qualifying semi-final had to lose again before being knocked-out of the play-offs entirely.

Bracket

Details 

Note A: Wigan Warriors vs Bradford Bulls was played at Stobart Stadium Halton due to the JJB Stadium being unavailable due to an association football fixture taking place the following day.

Progression table 

 Green cells indicate teams in play-off places at the end of the round. An underlined number indicates the team finished first in the table in that round.
 Note: Table is in round-by-round format, and does not necessarily follow chronological order. Rearranged fixtures are treated as though they were played on their respective rounds' weekends. Rearranged fixtures included:
 Leeds Rhinos vs Hull Kingston Rovers, Round 4
 Wigan Warriors vs Huddersfield Giants, Round 16

External links 
 Super League official website

Results